Pat Daugherty may refer to:
Patricia Daugherty, American management scientist
Patrick M. Daugherty (1928–1997), American politician

See also
Pat Dougherty
Patrick Dougherty (disambiguation)